The 2018–19  Nebraska Cornhuskers men's basketball team represented the University of Nebraska in the 2018–19 NCAA Division I men's basketball season. The Cornhuskers were led by seventh-year coach head coach Tim Miles and played their home games at Pinnacle Bank Arena in Lincoln, Nebraska as members of the Big Ten Conference. They finished the season 19–17, 6–14 in Big Ten play to finish in 13th place. In the Big Ten tournament, they defeated Rutgers and Maryland to advance to the quarterfinals where they lost to Wisconsin. They received an at-large bid to the National Invitation Tournament where they defeated Butler in the first round before losing to TCU.

On March 26, 2019, Tim Miles was fired. Four days later, the school hired former Chicago Bulls' head coach Fred Hoiberg as the next head coach.

Previous season
The Cornhuskers finished the 2017–18 season 2211, 13–5 in Big Ten play to finish in a tie for fourth place. As the No. 4 seed in the Big Ten tournament, they lost in the quarterfinals to Michigan. Despite winning 13 Big Ten games, the Cornhuskers did not receive a bid to the NCAA tournament, but did receive a bid to the National Invitation Tournament. However, they lost in the first round of the NIT to Mississippi State.

Offseason

Departures
On March 27, 2018, junior guard James Palmer Jr. announced that he would declare for the NBA draft, but not sign with an agent. Junior forward Isaac Copeland also declared for the draft, but did not sign with an agent. Both chose to return to Nebraska for their senior seasons before the NBA draft deadline.

Incoming transfers

2018 recruiting class
Following the departure of Nebraska assistant coach Kenya Hunter in April, 2018, signee Xavier Johnson was granted a release from his Letter of Intent to Nebraska.

Roster

Schedule and results
The 2018–19 season marked the first time in Big Ten history that the teams will play a 20-game conference schedule, setting a precedent for all Division I basketball. The new schedule also included a regional component to increase the frequency of games among teams in similar areas. Over the course of a six-year cycle (12 playing opportunities), in-state rivals will play each other 12 times, regional opponents will play 10 times, and all other teams will play nine times. Three in-state series will be guaranteed home-and-homes: Illinois and Northwestern, Indiana and Purdue, and Michigan and Michigan State will always play twice.

The Cornhuskers notably beat in state rival Creighton 94–75 in the 2018–19 season for the first time since the 2010–11 season.

Nebraska again participated in the Gavitt Tipoff Games where they defeated Seton Hall. The Cornuskers also participated in the CBE Hall of Fame Classic on November 19 and 20, at the Sprint Center in Kansas City, Missouri. Fellow participants in the tournament included Missouri State, Texas Tech, and USC.

|-
!colspan=9 style=|Exhibition

|-
!colspan=9 style=|Regular season

|-
!colspan=9 style=|Big Ten tournament

|-
!colspan=9 style=|NIT

Rankings

^Coaches did not release a Week 2 poll.

References

Nebraska
Nebraska Cornhuskers men's basketball seasons
Corn
Nebraska
Nebraska